Alice Lee (born in October 2009) is an American chess player who holds the titles of FIDE Master (FM) and Woman International Master (WIM).     She is a three-time world youth champion, the runner-up of the 2022 American Cup, and #3 rated female player in the USA (February 2023).

Early life and U.S. chess career 
Alice Lee began playing chess at age 6 in the school chess club where her older brother was already playing. 

She became a US Chess Expert at age 8 and a US Chess National Master (NM) at age 10.  

At age 9, she won the under-18 section of the 2019 National Girls Championships.  At age 12, she finished second place at the 2022 American Cup (Women's field).   

At age 13, her US Chess rating reached 2431 (February 2023), placing her as the #4 rated USA female player (all ages) and #2 rated USA player for her age group (all genders).

Because of her talent and accomplishments, Lee received the prestigious Samford Fellowship in 2022.

U.S. Women's Championships 

At age 12, Lee debuted at the 2022 U.S. Women's Championship and finished tied for 5th place in a field of 14 players.

World Youth Championships 

Lee is a three-time gold medalist at the World Youth Championships (under-10 girls section in 2019; under-12 girls section in 2020; under-12 girls section in 2021).   She was also the winner of the online FIDE Youth Rapid World Cup (under-12 girls section in 2021).

FIDE titles/ratings 

At age 11, Lee earned the WIM title by winning the under-18 girls section of the 2021 North American Youth Championships. 

At age 12, she earned her FM title, first International Master (IM) norm, and first Woman Grandmaster (WGM) norm at the 2022 Southwest Class Championships.  

At age 13, she won a second IM norm and a second WGM norm at the 1000GM St. Louis IM Norm Tournament. 

At age 13, Lee's FIDE rating reached 2362 (February 2023), becoming the world's #81 rated female player (all ages), world's #8 rated junior female player (under 20), and USA's #3 rated female player (all ages).

Notable games 

At the 2022 Southwest Class Championships, Lee (2237) defeated IM Viktor Gazik (2543) to clinch her first IM norm.  

At the 2023 Pro Chess League, Lee (2362) defeated GM Matthias Bluebaum (2661) (Berlin Bears)   and GM Bogdan-Daniel Deac (2700) (Croatia Bulldogs)   to help St. Louis Arch Bishops reach playoffs.

References

Living people
2009 births
American female chess players
Chess FIDE Masters
Chess Woman International Masters